Eduardo Araújo Moreira (born 19 April 1974 in Ipauçu) commonly known as Edu is a retired Brazilian footballer who played as a midfielder.

Career

Eastern Europe
Edu joined Alania Vladikavkaz of the Russian Premier League in July 1998. He played for Spartak-Chukotka Moscow of the Russian First Division in the first half of the 2000 season. He then spent one year at Krylia Sovetov Samara, and the rest of the 2001 season at Anzhi Makhachkala.

Edu then moved to Ukraine to play for Arsenal Kyiv in second half of 2001-02 season and 2002-03 season.

Edu joined Belarusian team Torpedo Minsk in August 2003. As the club was expelled from the league at the start of 2005 season, he joined Dinamo Minsk.

In July 2011 he returned to Brazil and signed a contract with Santacruzense.
.

Career statistics

References

External links
 
 CBF 

1974 births
Living people
Footballers from São Paulo (state)
Brazilian footballers
Brazilian expatriate footballers
Association football midfielders
Russian Premier League players
Expatriate footballers in Russia
Expatriate footballers in Ukraine
Expatriate footballers in Belarus
FC Spartak Vladikavkaz players
PFC Krylia Sovetov Samara players
FC Anzhi Makhachkala players
FC Arsenal Kyiv players
FC Torpedo Minsk players
FC Dinamo Minsk players